Christopher Wlezien (born April 25, 1961) is the Hogg Professor of Government at the University of Texas at Austin. He previously taught at the University of Oxford, Temple University, and the University of Houston, and has affiliations with other universities in the US and elsewhere. Wlezien teaches and researches in a number of areas, including public opinion, elections, institutions, policy, and research methodology. A long-standing research project develops and tests a "thermostatic" model of public opinion and policy in the US and other countries, recent work on which examines the mediating role of news coverage. He has published many journal articles and chapters. In addition, he has also written books including Degrees of Democracy, The Timeline of Elections, and Who Gets Represented among others.

References

Academics of the University of Oxford
1961 births
Living people
University of Texas at Austin faculty
Temple University faculty
University of Houston faculty